Burmese royal titles are the royal styles that were in use by the Burmese monarchy until the disintegration of the last Burmese monarchy, the Konbaung dynasty, in 1885. These titles were exclusively used by those of royal lineage, or more formally, Maha Zi Maha Thwei.

Titles and rank in the Konbaung dynasty

King

Kings in Burma assumed a distinctive regnal name and title, usually a combination of Pali and Sanskrit, upon ascending to the throne.

The King was known by a variety of titles, including the following:
Hpondawgyi (Hlathaw) Hpaya
Ashin Hpaya
Shwe Nan Shin Hpaya
Ekarit Min Myat
Shin Bayin
Athet U San Paing Than Ashin (lit. "Lord of the life, head, and hair of all beings")
Shwe Nan Shwe Pyatthat Thahkin (lit. "Master Lord of the Golden Palace and Golden Spired Roofs") - used in the Taungoo and Konbaung dynasties
Hkamedaw (lit. "royal father") - by his children (the princes and princesses)
Dagadaw Yemyeshin - by Buddhist monks
Dagadaw Ekarit Min Myat - by Buddhist monks

King's consorts

In the early days of the Konbaung Dynasty, Kings had at most, three Senior Queens. Innovations of a fourth Senior Queen and four lesser queens dated to the last quarter of the 1700s.

Queens of first rank (Senior Queens) were called Nanya Mibaya (lit. 'Queens who Possess Palaces'). The expansion and ranking of Senior Queens was an innovation during the reign of King Singu Min (1776-1782). In order of precedence, they were as follows:

Supreme Royal Chief Queen (Nanmadaw Mibaya Hkaunggyi) or Royal Queen of the Southern Palace (Taung Nandaw Mibaya) - As the Supreme Chief Queen, she alone had the right to a white umbrella and to sit with the King on the royal throne. She was also variously known as Taung Nyazan, Ashin Nanmadaw Hpaya. and Nanmadaw
Royal Queen of the Northern Palace (Myauk Nandaw Mibaya)
Royal Queen of the Central Palace (Ale Nandaw Mibaya)
Royal Queen of the Western Palace (Anauk Nandaw Mibaya)

There was a special position between Nanya Mibaya (first rank) and Ahsaungya Mibaya (second rank) named Nanzwe Mibaya, for the blue-blood sisters of the King, primed to become a Nanya Mibaya if any of them died. For example, when the first Anauk Nandaw Mibaya of King Mindon, Pintale Mibaya died, her sister Yinge Mibaya, one of the four Nanzwe Mibayas of King Mindon, was replaced as the second Anauk Nandaw Mibaya. As they were the blue-blooded ones, they could not be given the position of ordinary queens. So they became Nanzwe Mibayas. This position was created only during the reign of a king who had many queens, such as Bodawpaya and Mindon Min.

Royal Queens of second rank were known as Ahsaungya Mibaya (lit. 'Queens who Possess Royal Apartments'). These ranks were created during the reign of King Tharrawaddy Min (1837-1846). In order of precedence, they were as follows:
 
Royal Queen of the Southern Apartment (Taung Hsaungdaw Mibaya)
Royal Queen of the Northern Apartment (Myauk Hsaungdaw Mibaya)

Royal Queens of third rank were known as Shweye Hsaungya Mibaya (lit. 'Royal Queens who Possess the Gilded Chambers'). These were innovations dating to the reign of King Bodawphaya. In order of precedence, they were as follows:

Royal Queen of the Southern Gilded Chamber (Myan Aung Taung Shweye Hsaung Mibaya)
Royal Queen of the Northern Gilded Chamber (Myan Aung Myauk Shweye Hsaung Mibaya)
Royal Queen of the Central Gilded Chamber (Myan Aung Ale Shweye Hsaung Mibaya)
Royal Queen of the Western Gilded Chamber (Myan Aung Anauk Shweye Hsaung Mibaya)

Royal Queens of fourth rank were considered minor consorts:

Myosa Mibaya ('town-lord queen')
Ywaza Mibaya ('village-lord queen')

Royal concubines were typically the daughters of officials and tributary princes. They received no rank and in order of precedence were as follows:

Kolottaw (lit. "one who administers the royal body")
Chedawtin (lit. "one on whom the royal feet are placed")
Maungma

Consorts were granted titles based on rank, divided into two grades (queens and for concubines).

The styles of queens contained the following words based on rank, as follows (in order of precedence):
Devī (Pali 'goddess') 
Mahe (Pali 'queen') or Hesī (Pali 'queen')
Sīri (Pali 'splendour') 
Su (Pali 'well') 
Min (Burmese 'lord')

The styles of royal concubines contained the following words based on rank, as follows (in order of precedence):
Devī (Pali 'goddess') 
Vatī (Pali 'dutiful') 
Rujā 
Pabhā (Pali 'radiance') 
Kesā (Pali 'hair') 
Candā (Pali 'moon')
Mālā (Pali 'garland') 
Muttā (Pali 'pearl')

Princes
Royal princes included the sons and brothers of the King (Minnyi Mintha) who were ranked, as follows (in order of precedence):
Crown Prince (Einshay Mintha) - the Heir Apparent, who was appointed by the King and second only to the King in precedence. He was also known as the Uparaja.
Great Princes (Minthagyi) - First-grade princes (the King's brothers and the sons of Senior Queens). There were 18 Great Princes at any given time, divided into 9 of the left and 9 of the right. 
Shwe Kodawgyi Awratha: The eldest son of the King, by his chief Queen
Shwe Kodawgyi Razaputra: The younger sons of the King, by his chief Queen
Shwe Kodawgyi: The sons of the King, by his senior Queens
Middle Princes (Minthalat) - Second grade princes born of lesser queens. There were 18 Middle Princes at any given time, divided into 9 of the left and 9 of the right.
Kodawgyi: The sons of the King, by his junior wives
Princes (Mintha) - Minor princes born of concubines

Non-royal princes were individuals of non-royal lineage who were promoted to the rank of prince, and were divided into there ranks, each of which consisted of 18 princes at any given time, divided into 9 of the left and 9 of the right.: They were ranked, as follows (in order of precedence):
Great Princes (Minthagyi) - The first grade of non-royal princes
Middle Princes (Minthalat) - The second grade of non-royal princes
Cavalry Captain Princes (Myinhmu Mintha) - The third grade of non-royal princes

Princely titles were granted based on the prince's rank (of which there were 12 total), which divided into three grades, as follows (in order of precedence):
Dhammaraja - usually suffixed to the prince's title.
First rank - granted a title of 10 syllables
Second rank - granted a title of 9 syllables
Third rank - granted a title of 8 syllables
Fourth rank - granted a title of 6 syllables
Thado - usually prefixed to the prince's title.
Fifth rank - granted a title of 8 syllables
Sixth rank - granted a title of 6 syllables
Seventh rank - granted a title of 5 syllables
Eighth rank - granted a title of 3 syllables
Minye - usually prefixed to the prince's title.
Ninth rank - granted a title of 7 syllables
Tenth rank - granted a title of 6 syllables
Eleventh rank - granted a title of 4 syllables
Twelfth rank - granted a title of 3 syllables

Princesses
The ranks of the King's daughters were determined by the rank of their mothers. These ranks in order of precedence were as follows:
Hteik Suhpaya - The daughters of the King by his queens
Hteik Hkaungtin - The unmarried daughters of the King, by his minor consorts
Hteik Hta Mibaya - The married daughters of the King, by his junior wives

The Crown Princess in line to become chief queen, specially designated to wed the Crown Prince was known as the Tabindaing Minthami or as the Einshe Hteik Hta Mibaya.

Ranking officials
High-ranking court officials (amat) were also ranked into 9 ranks, representing their place at the Great Audience Hall during obeisance ceremonies (gadaw), as follows (in order of precedence):

Sitthugyi – commander-in-chief
Neyalutne  (lit. 'those without place') - dignitaries above rank, including the tributary princes (saophas and myosas)
Sawbwagyi Naukne (lit. 'those behind the saophas)
Tawchun
Taw
Du
Sani
Atwin Bawaw
Apyin Bawaw

Said officials also received 11 types of titles commensurate with their rank, as follows (in order of precedence):
Thado, from Sanskrit satviva shaktidhara
Mingyi
Mahā (Pali 'great')
Min Thon Hsin Bwe - title containing three Min 
Min Hna Hsin Bwe - title containing two Min 
Min Ta Hsin Bwe - title containing one Min 
Nemyo Min
Nemyo (Burmese 'solar race')
Nawrahta
Shwedaung
Ordinary titles

The wives of some high-ranking officials also received rank, as follows (in order of precedence):

Amaydawkhan Gadawgyi
Gadaw
Shethwe
Naukthwe
Pwetet Neya
Letsaungdaw Thein Thami Kanya

See also 
 Burmese Buddhist titles
 Konbaung Dynasty

References

Sources

 

 
Konbaung dynasty
Titles of national or ethnic leadership